Jimmy Gallu is a 1982 Indian Kannada-language drama film directed by K. S. L. Swamy and produced by Shashirekha. The story is written by Venugopal Kasaragod. The film stars Vishnuvardhan, Sripriya, Lokesh and Hema Choudhary. The film was widely appreciated for its songs and story upon release. The songs composed by Vijaya Bhaskar were huge hits. The film was remade in Telugu as Muddayi and in Hindi as Mulzim.

Cast 
 Vishnuvardhan as Jimmy
 Sripriya as Sudha
 Lokesh 
 Hema Chowdhary
 Sundar Krishna Urs
 Keerthi Vishnuvardhan
 Vajramuni
 Thoogudeepa Srinivas
 Dwarakish

 K. S. Ashwath
 Tiger Prabhakar
 N. S. Rao
 Shashikala
 Dinesh

Soundtrack 
The music of the film was composed by Vijaya Bhaskar and the lyrics were written by Chi. Udaya Shankar. The songs "Thuttu Anna" sung by Vishnuvardhan and the duet song "Deva Mandiradalli" were received extremely well.

References

External links 
 
 Jimmy Gallu at Raaga

1982 films
1980s Kannada-language films
Indian drama films
Films scored by Vijaya Bhaskar
Kannada films remade in other languages
Films directed by K. S. L. Swamy